Wysing Arts Centre is a contemporary arts residency centre and campus for artistic production, experimentation and learning in South Cambridgeshire, England.  The centre was established in 1989 and completed a £1.7 million capital development project in 2008. Across the eleven-acre site the centre holds ten buildings, including 24 low-cost artists' studios, a live-work space, specialist new media facilities, a large gallery, education facilities and a 17th-century grade II listed farmhouse which is used as accommodation for residencies and retreats. The main focus of the centre's activities is the international residency programme, but it also hosts temporary exhibitions, retreats, a programme for young artists, semi-permanent sculptural and architectural commissions and works on offsite projects with many other institutions nationally and internationally. It is a registered charity under English law.

In 2010 Wysing was invited to join Plus Tate; one of only two of the twenty organisations in the network whose work is focused on process and production rather than on the presentation of extant works. Alongside Plus Tate, Wysing has a number of partnerships in place with organisations including the Royal College of Art, the Royal Society of Arts, the British Council, the Contemporary Art Society, Anglia Ruskin University, Cambridge University and the Contemporary Visual Arts Network.

Residencies

 Convention T – including artists Anna Barham, James Beckett, Michael Dean, Cécile B. Evans, David Osbaldeston, Seb Patane, Charlotte Prodger and Florian Roithmayr
 The Forest – including artists Jonathan Baldock, Edwin Burdis, Emma Hart and Jess Flood-Paddock, and musician Luke Abbott
 The Mirror – including artists Ed Atkins, Nicolas Deshayes, Philomene Pirecki and Elizabeth Price
 The Cosmos – Salvatore Arancio, Flora Parrott, Nilsson Pflugfelder and Stuart Whipps
 The Department of Overlooked Histories – including artists An Endless Supply, Ruth Beale, Karin Kihlberg & Reuben Henry and Emma Smith
 The Department of Psychedelic Studies – including artists Mark Essen, Hilary Koob-Sassen, Kate Owens, Damien Roach
 The Department of Wrong Answers – including artists Rob Filby, Francesco Pedraglio & Laure Prouvost, Giles Round and Cally Spooner
 The Camp For Improbable Thinking – including artists Asli Cavusoglu, Andy Holden, Fabiano Marques, Julie Myers, Emily Rosamond and Bedwyr Williams
 Communities under Construction – including artists A Kassen, Folke Köbberling and Martin Kaltwasser, N55, Public Works, Townley and Bradby and Helen Stratford
 Wysing Polyphonic: The Ungoverned (guest curated by Anne Duffau) – including artists Maëva Berthelot, Whiskey Chow, CRYSTALLMESS, Tanaka Fuego, Hannah Catherine Jones, Rachel Long, LYZZA, mobilegirl, Coby Sey and audio research group AUDINT

Exhibitions

 Jonathan Baldock – A Strange Cross Between a Butchers Shop and a Nightclub
 Relatively Absolute – including artists Luke Abbott, Salvatore Arancio, Ed Atkins, Jonathan Baldock, Edwin Burdis, Patrick Coyle, Nicolas Deshayes, Jess Flood-Paddock, Emma Hart, Nilsson Pflugfelder, Flora Parrott, Philomene Pirecki, Elizabeth Price and Stuart Whipps
 Recollect including artists Better Futures Forever, Jackie Chettur, Phil Coy, Sean Edwards, Karin Kihlberg & Reuben Henry, Una Knox, Rosie Pedlow & Joe King.
 The Starry Rubric Set – including artists Marjolijn DijkmAn, Ruth Beale, Nicholas Deshayes, Rob Filby, John Latham, Karin Kihlberg & Reuben Henry, Kate Owens, Laure Prouvost, Giles Round
 Slipped – including artists Aaron Angell, Caroline Achaintre, Lucy Conochie, Coco Crampton, Mark Essen, The Grantchester Pottery, Lawrence Leaman, Giles Round, Phil Root and Jesse Wine.

Funding
Wysing Arts Centre is one of Arts Council England's National Portfolio Organisations.  Additional financial support for the programme comes from trusts and foundations including the Paul Hamlyn Foundation, the Henry Moore Foundation, The Leverhulme Foundation and The Ernest Cooke Trust.

See also

 The Hepworth Wakefield
 Middlesbrough Institute of Modern Art
 Turner Contemporary
 Tate St Ives
 Baltic Centre for Contemporary Art
 Nottingham Contemporary
 Firstsite
 Kettle's Yard

References

External links
 Official website
 Bourn Village website

Art museums established in 1989
Arts centres in England
Contemporary art galleries in England
1989 establishments in England
Art museums and galleries in Cambridgeshire
Charities based in England